Duane Edward Derksen is a Canadian ice hockey coach and former goaltender who was an All-American for Wisconsin and led the Peoria Rivermen to a Kelly Cup championship in 2000.

Career
Derksen was a highly rated prospect in his junior career. In spite of poor statistics with the Winkler Flyers, Derksen was twice named as the best goaltender in the MJHL. He was selected in the 3rd round of the NHL Draft and began attending the University of Wisconsin–Madison that fall. In his freshman season, Derksen served as a backup to future NHL All-Star Curtis Joseph, playing in only a quarter of Wisconsin's games. After Joseph turned pro after 1989, the team turned to Derksen as the starter and he came through in a big way. He improved his stats significantly and won a program record 31 games that season (still a Wisconsin record as of 2021). Derksen was instrumental in helping the Badgers finish first in the WCHA and was the top goaltender as Wisconsin won their conference tournament. Wisconsin received the second western seed and began the NCAA Tournament in the quarterfinals. Derksen was key in the Badgers winning two close games, particularly the national semifinal against Boston College, and made the championship game. Derksen wasn't as sharp in the final game but he didn't have to be. Wisconsin's offense overpowered the star-struck Colgate Raiders and the Badgers easily won the game 7–3.

Derksen continued to improve in his junior season, finishing in the top 10 in the nation in goals against average with 3 shutouts to his credit. The Badgers weren't as good with several departures from the roster but the team did manage to receive another NCAA tournament bid. Derksen was named an alternate captain for his senior year and was the leader for the team. He helped Wisconsin to a second place finish in the WCHA and was named the conference Player of the Year. While the Badgers were upset in the WCHA Tournament, they still managed to earn the final western seed for the NCAA Tournament. Derksen played a pivotal role in getting the Badgers to win three games as an underdog and reach the championship game. The last match turned out to be a controversial affair, with both Wisconsin and Lake Superior State receiving double-digit penalties in the game. The Badgers got out to a 2–0 lead after the first but a series of questionable calls allowed the Lakers to take a lead early in the third. Wisconsin was so incensed by the performance of the referee that assistant coach Bill Zito accosted the official after the game with two other players, an incident for which all three were suspended by the NCAA. In the end, however, the result didn't matter for the Badgers as the team had committed several recruiting violations and their entire appearance in the 1992 tournament was later vacated. Neither Derksen nor anyone from the 1990 team had been a part of the violations so his championship was safe.

After graduating with a bachelor's in history, Derksen began his professional career in the Washington Capitals' farm system. He spent three fairly unspectacular seasons bouncing between minor leagues, producing decent numbers but not playing well enough to get a shot at the NHL level. Once his rookie contract expired he was not resigned and then spent two years with the Madison Monsters before heading to Europe. Derksen had much more success with Oulun Kärpät and was able to sell his success to the Peoria Rivermen. He served as the team's starter for the 2000 season and led them to a league championship that season. Despite the success he had no takers at the next level of the minor leagues and returned to Europe. Derksen was back with the Rivermen two years later and, though his numbers were even better, he wasn't able to replicate the success he had had the first time around. After one more season of professional hockey he hung up his pads and called it a career.

With his playing days behind him, Derksen transitioned into Sales and marketing working in the field for two years before returning to college to earn a business degree. He continues as an account manager, most recently with Ingersoll Rand (as of 2021), but did eventually return to ice hockey as an assistant coach in the summer of 2020.

Statistics

Regular season and playoffs

Awards and honors

References

External links

1968 births
Living people
AHCA Division I men's ice hockey All-Americans
Canadian ice hockey goaltenders
People from Saint Boniface, Winnipeg
Ice hockey people from Winnipeg
Wisconsin Badgers men's ice hockey players
Baltimore Skipjacks players
Hampton Roads Admirals players
Milwaukee Admirals players
Rochester Americans players
Adirondack Red Wings players
Minnesota Moose players
Richmond Renegades players
Madison Monsters players
Oulun Kärpät players
Tappara players
Peoria Rivermen (ECHL) players
Iserlohn Roosters players
EC Bad Tölz players
Missouri River Otters players
Washington Capitals draft picks
NCAA men's ice hockey national champions